Coleophora baischi is a moth of the family Coleophoridae. It is found in Turkey.

The wingspan is about 15 mm.

References

baischi
Endemic fauna of Turkey
Moths described in 2007
Moths of Asia